Amaury de la Moussaye (5 November 1900 – 2 August 1973) was a French equestrian. He competed in two events at the 1936 Summer Olympics.

References

1900 births
1973 deaths
French male equestrians
Olympic equestrians of France
Equestrians at the 1936 Summer Olympics
Sportspeople from Lyon